"Georgy Girl" is a song by the Australian pop/folk music group The Seekers. It was used as the title song for the 1966 film of the same title. Tom Springfield, who had written "I'll Never Find Another You", composed the music and Jim Dale supplied the lyrics. The song is heard at both the beginning and end of the film, with markedly different lyrics (and with different lyrics again from those in the commercially released version). It was nominated for an Academy Award for Best Original Song but the prize went to "Born Free".

The song became a hit in late 1966 and early 1967, reaching number one in Australia and number three in the United Kingdom. In the United States, it was the Seekers' highest charting single, reaching number one on the Cash Box Top 100. "Georgy Girl" reached number two on the Billboard Hot 100; "I'm a Believer" by The Monkees, kept the song from number one. The song's U.S. success prompted the Seekers' British album Come the Day to be retitled Georgy Girl for its American release.

Chart history

Weekly charts

Year-end charts

Cover versions
In 1966, The Lennon Sisters recorded a cover of this song as well, which did not chart as well as the original song. It was performed by the sisters in The Lawrence Welk Show.

In 1967, an instrumental version by the Baja Marimba Band reached number 98 on the US Billboard Hot 100 chart and number 14 on the easy listening chart.

The New Seekers, a reorganized group from 1969 with guitarist Keith Potger, released a version of the song on the UK version of the album We'd Like to Teach the World to Sing.

In 1971 Saori Minami recorded a cover of the song for her second album Shiokaze No Melody.

The "Georgy Girl" song and melody appear in a reworked version with new lyrics in the early 1980s Barbie doll commercials such as Beauty Secrets Barbie and Angel Face Barbie, among others.

References

Cashbox number-one singles
Number-one singles in Australia
RPM Top Singles number-one singles
Number-one singles in New Zealand
1967 singles
Songs written for films
Songs written by Tom Springfield
Columbia Graphophone Company singles
Capitol Records singles
1966 songs
The Seekers songs